Federal Route 147, or Jalan Bagan Serai–Alor Pongsu–Selama (formerly Perak State Route A6 and A7), is a federal road in Perak, Malaysia. The Kilometre Zero of the Federal Route 147 starts at Bagan Serai.

Features
At most sections, the Federal Route 147 was built under the JKR R3 and R4 road standard, with a speed limit of 70 km/h to 80 km/h. Due to the most section of this route historicly are swampy lands, unexpected unevens road and soften road shoulders condition will occur without warning. During the monsoon season and heavy rain, some sections like Kampung Beriah often flood and are closed to light vehicles. One of the alternative routes to get to Selama, Kubu Gajah and Changkat Lobak or to Bagan Serai, Alor Pongsu and Alor Pongsu Tollgate should go through Jalan Pintasan to  Jalan Gunung Semanggol-Changkat Lobak (Jalan Bukit Merah) or vice versa to get to the destination.

List of junctions

References

147